Epeolus lectoides, the cuckoo bee, is a species of cuckoo bee in the family Apidae. It is found in North America. Hosts include Colletes latitarsis and Colletes nudus.

References

Further reading

External links

 

Nomadinae
Articles created by Qbugbot
Insects described in 1901